"Järjetön rakkaus" (Mindless Love) is the second single release by Finnish singer Jesse Kaikuranta from his first album Vie mut kotiin. It was released as a digital single on 14 September 2012. The accompanying music video was uploaded to YouTube on 14 October 2012.

Chart performance 

"Järjetön rakkaus" peaked at number six on the Official Finnish Download Chart  and at number 16 on the Finnish Singles Chart.

Charts

References

2012 singles
Finnish-language songs
Jesse Kaikuranta songs
2012 songs
Universal Music Group singles